This is the discography for contemporary Christian music artist Misty Edwards.

Discography

References

Discographies of American artists
Christian music discographies